) is an Italian television late-night talk show hosted by Fabio Fazio.

It has been broadcast live on Saturdays and Sundays on the Italian TV since 2003.

The show has been aired since 13 September 2003 on Rai 3 up to 4 June 2017. On 24 September 2017 it moved to Rai 1, until 2 June 2019. On 29 September 2019 the show moved to Rai 2, and in September 2020 it went back on Rai 3.

 is a one-to-one talk show with guests every weekend night. Current events, political, economic, sporting, musical, literary, cinematic, scientific, nature and environmental issues of topical interest are discussed. Fabio Fazio's feature is having friendly conversations rather than formal interviews.

During its permanence on Rai 3 its prime-time share was of 15%, with an audience of 3,500,000 people, which raised up to 21% (around 5,000,000 people) with its first venue on Rai 1.

Notable guests
Through years the show hosted many Italian and international guests. Amongst them there are: Pope Francis, Adele, Tom Hanks, Meryl Streep, LP, Charlize Theron, Anastacia, Lewis Hamilton, Sebastian Vettel, Charles Leclerc, Michel Platini, Pelé, Alice Merton, Yanis Varoufakis, Emmanuel Macron, John Bercow, Al Gore, Condoleezza Rice, Bill Gates, Robert Plant, Vincent Cassel, Louis Garrel, Uma Thurman, Russell Crowe, Ryan Gosling, Ron Howard, Woody Allen, Naomi Campbell, John Travolta, Hugh Grant, Jean Dujardin, Matthew McConaughey, Robert De Niro, Matt Damon, George Clooney, Madonna, Lady Gaga, U2, Coldplay, Michael Phelps, Novak Djokovic, Jean Todt, Whoopi Goldberg, Dan Brown, Ken Follett, Jane Fonda, Greta Thunberg, Michael Houghton, Glenn Close, Sharon Stone, Susan Sarandon, Anthony Fauci, Nancy Pelosi and Barack Obama.

Series overview
</onlyinclude>
Notes

References

External links

RAI original programming
Italian television talk shows
Italian television shows
2003 Italian television series debuts
2000s Italian television series
2010s Italian television series